This list of Ports and harbours in the Democratic Republic of Congo details the ports, harbours around the coast of the Democratic Republic of Congo.

List of ports and harbours in the Democratic Republic of Congo

External links

References

the Democratic Republic of Congo
Ports and harbours
Ports and harbours in Africa